Events during the year 2023 in Italy.

Incumbents 
President: Sergio Mattarella
Prime Minister: Giorgia Meloni

Events

January 
 1 January: A peace concert is organized in Rome.
 180 people - including 50 minors - are injured by barrels and firecrackers during New Year celebrations.
 In Rome, an Israeli girl is stabbed at Termini station.
 2 January: In Rome the last generation environmental group vandalizes Palazzo Madama. three people are arrested.
 Denise Pipitone case, the health card of the child who disappeared 19 years ago is issued and is delivered to the parents.
 4 January: The historic Vecchia Milano pastry shop in the center of Milan closes after 50 years of service.
 5 January: In Genoa, a security guard shoots his girlfriend and then takes his own life, the first Italian femicide of 2023.
 In Somma Vesuviana (municipality in the province of Naples) 90 fines are imposed in two days due to occupation of the area available only for the disabled.
 6 January: In Arezzo, Tuscany, a man tries to demolish a house after an argument with a man, killing the same man with a gunshot.
 8 January: Clash on the A1 highway of Arezzo between ultras from Roma and Naples.
 14 January: Starbucks open its first store in Campania in the city of Marcianise (CE).
 A woman is killed by her ex-partner outside a restaurant near Rome.
16 January: Mafia boss Matteo Messina Denaro, one of the most wanted men in Italy and Europe, is arrested in Palermo, Sicily, after 30 years on the run.

February 
 17 February: A public transport strike takes place in Rome.
 21 February: Most Italian voice actors go on strike following a lack of protection and salary increases, and the use of their voices by artificial intelligences without permission.  This generates unease among fans who are waiting for the series dubbed into Italian.
 18 February: A neo-fascist group attacks the students of a high school in Florence with kicks and punches.
 26 February: 2023 Calabria migrant boat disaster: At least 60 people are killed and 80 others are rescued after a boat carrying migrants capsizes in rough seas off the southern coast of Calabria.

March 
 9 March: In Viterbo neo-Nazi banners are displayed with insults to the new secretary of the Democratic Party Elly Schlein.

Predicted and scheduled  
2023 Democratic Party (Italy) leadership election
2023 Lombard regional election

Deaths 
 1 January – Mario Artali, 84, businessman and politician, deputy (1972–1976).
 2 January – Massimo Turci, 92, voice actor.
 3 January – Giorgio Tombesi, 96, politician, deputy (1976–1983).
 4 January –Heinrich Oberleiter, 81, South Tyrolean separatis.
 5 January – 
 Giorgio Otranto, 82, historian.
 Ernesto Castano, 83, footballer (Triestina, Juventus, national team).
 6 January – 
 Gervasio Gestori, 86, Roman Catholic prelate, bishop of San Benedetto del Tronto-Ripatransone-Montalto (1996–2013).
 Gianluca Vialli, 58, footballer (Sampdoria, national team) and manager (Chelsea).
 Renzo Sacco, 78, politician, president of the Province of Padua (1995–1998).
 Victoria de Stefano, 82, Italian-Venezuelan novelist.
7 January – 
Tony Pantano, 74, Italian-born Australian singer and entertainer.
Gian Pietro Testa, 86, writer, journalist and poet.
10 January – Gaudenzio Bernasconi, 90, footballer (Atalanta, Sampdoria, national team).
11 January – Antonio Muratore, 95, politician, senator (1983–1994).
12 January – 
Biagio Conte, 59, missionary.
Vittorio Garatti, 95, architect.
14 January – Gianfranco Baruchello, 98, painter.
16 January – Gina Lollobrigida, 95, actress (Bread, Love and Dreams, Come September, The Hunchback of Notre Dame).
17 January –
Gino Landi, 89, choreographer and television and theatre director.
Nicola Molè, 91, lawyer and politician, president of the Province of Terni (1995–1999).
Nicola Zamboni, 79, sculptor.
18 January – Cesare Veneziani, 89, politician, mayor of Bergamo (1999–2004).
21 January – Pino Roveredo, 68, writer.
22 January –
Gianfranco Goberti, 83, painter.
Mario Pupella, 77, actor (Angela, Salvo, Padrenostro) and theater director.
23 January – Patrizio Billio, 48, footballer (Crystal Palace, Ancona, Dundee).
24 January – Benito Bollati, 96, lawyer and politician, deputy (1974–1979).
27 January – Pietro Forquet, 97, bridge player.
28 January – Carlo Tavecchio, 79, football executive, president of the FIGC (2014–2017).
29 January – Vito Chimenti, 69, football player (Matera, Palermo, Taranto) and manager.
31 January – Luigi Pasinetti, 92, economist.
1 February – Renato Benaglia, 84, football player (Fiorentina, Catania, Roma) and coach.
2 February –
Enzo Carra, 79, journalist and politician, deputy (2001–2013)
Monica Comegna, 43, actress (South Kensington).
3 February –
Sergio Solli, 78, actor (Il mistero di Bellavista, I Can Quit Whenever I Want, Ciao, Professore!).
Dante Stefani, 95, partisan and politician, senator (1979–1987).
Giuseppina Bersani, 73, Olympic fencer (1972).
4 February –
Luciano Armani, 82, racing cyclist.
Elettra Deiana, 81, teacher and politician, deputy (2001–2008).
5 February – Renato Del Ponte, 78, essayist.
6 February – Nicolò Mineo, 89, literary critic, literary historian and philologist.
7 February – 
Alfredo Rizzo, 89, Olympic runner (1960).
Pio D'Emilia, 68, journalist (il manifesto, L'Espresso).
8 February – Elena Fanchini, 37, Olympic alpine ski racer (2006, 2010, 2014).
9 February – Piero Montanari, 76, composer and bassist.
10 February – Giovanni Bettini, 84, architect and politician, deputy (1979–1983).
15 February –
Dario Penne, 84, actor (E le stelle stanno a guardare) and voice actor.
Leone Manti, 79,  politician, deputy (1992–1994).
Giampiero Neri, 95,  poet.
16 February –
Alberto Radius, 80, guitarist and singer-songwriter (Formula 3).
Giorgio Ruffolo, 96, politician, MP (1983–1994) and minister of the environment (1987–1992).
Mario Vitti, 96, Italian philologist.
Mario Zurlini, 80, Italian football player (Napoli, F.C. Matera) and coach (Savoia).
17 February – Maurizio Scaparro, 91, stage director.
18 February – Ilario Castagner, 82, football player and manager (Perugia, Milan, Inter Milan).
23 February – Giuseppe Nirta, 82, mobster.
24 February – Maurizio Costanzo, 84, television host, journalist, and screenwriter (The House with Laughing Windows, A Special Day, Zeder).
26 February – Curzio Maltese, 63, journalist (la Repubblica, La Gazzetta dello Sport) and politician, MEP (2014–2019).

References

 
Italy
Italy
2020s in Italy
Years of the 21st century in Italy